Kolahduz (also Romanized as Kolāhdūz and Koleh Dūz; also known as Kolāb Dūz) is a village in Pol-e Doab Rural District, Zalian District, Shazand County, Markazi Province, Iran. At the 2006 census, its population was 417, in 104 families.

References 

Populated places in Shazand County